Kordabad (also Romanized as Kordābād and Kerdābād) is a village in Montazeriyeh Rural District, in the Central District of Tabas County, South Khorasan Province, Iran. At the 2006 census, its population was 145, in 27 families.

References 

Populated places in Tabas County